Karamlu (also Romanized as Karamlū; also known as Karam Chalkī, Karam Shāhlū, and Karamshakli) is a village in Arshaq-e Markazi Rural District, Arshaq District, Meshgin Shahr County, Ardabil Province, Iran. At the 2006 census, its population was 410, in 99 families.

References 

Towns and villages in Meshgin Shahr County